Tecnotree Corporation is a Finnish vendor of software to telecommunications service providers. It operates in the BSS sector.

History
In 2008 the Finnish company Tecnomen acquired Indian company Lifetree for $46 million. Initially it was rebranded as Tecnomen Lifetree before being rebranded once more in 2010 as Tecnotree. 

Tecnomen itself was founded in 1978 and was headquartered in Espoo, Finland, where Tecnotree's headquarters are also based.

Tecnotree has offices in Finland, France, South Africa, India, Malaysia, Argentina, Ecuador and Peru. In 2019 it opened a new customer experience centre in Dubai.

References

External links
Company website

Telecommunications companies of Finland
Companies based in Espoo
Telecommunications companies established in 1978
1978 establishments in Finland
Companies listed on Nasdaq Helsinki
Finnish companies established in 1978